Radar homing may refer to:

Active radar homing
Semi-active radar homing

See also
Radar lock-on